Madeleine Taylor-Quinn (born 26 May 1951) is a former Irish Fine Gael politician who served as a Senator for the Cultural and Educational Panel from 1981 to 1982 and 1992 to 2002 and a Teachta Dála (TD) for the Clare constituency from 1981 to 1982 and 1982 to 1992.

Taylor-Quinn is a native of Kilkee, County Clare. She was educated at the Convent of Mercy Secondary School in Kilrush, and at University College Galway, graduating with a Bachelor of Arts (BA), Bachelor of Education (H.Dip.Ed), and Bachelor of Laws (LLB). She began her career as a teacher. She became a founder member of Young Fine Gael in 1977, and Joint Honorary Secretary of Fine Gael from 1979 to 1982, the first woman officer in the party.

She was elected to Dáil Éireann on her first attempt, at the 1981 general election, succeeding her father Frank Taylor, who had been a TD from 1969 to 1981. She was County Clare's first-ever female TD, she took her seat in the 22nd Dáil as Fine Gael leader Garret FitzGerald was elected Taoiseach, heading a Fine Gael-Labour Party coalition government.

The government fell in January 1982 when it was defeated in a vote on the budget, and at the February 1982 general election Taylor-Quinn lost her seat to Fine Gael's other candidate, Donal Carey. She was then elected to the 16th Seanad as a Senator for the Cultural and Educational Panel.

She regained her Dáil seat later that year, at the November 1982 general election, and was re-elected at the 1987 and 1989 general elections. She lost her seat at the 1992 general election. She stood again at the 1997 and 2002 elections, but was unsuccessful.

After her Dáil defeat in 1992, Taylor-Quinn was elected to the Seanad Éireann, again for the Cultural and Educational Panel, which re-elected her in 1997 to the 21st Seanad. She was defeated at the 2002 Seanad elections. She also stood as a Fine Gael candidate at the 2004 European Parliament election, for the North-West constituency, achieving over 22,000 votes in the Clare constituency, which was the highest vote of any candidate in any election in County Clare, but was defeated. She again contested the Clare constituency at the 2007 general election, winning 3,592 first preferences. Her party colleagues Pat Breen and Joe Carey won the Fine Gael seats.

In the Dáil, she has served at various times as her party's Spokesperson on Tourism, the Marine and Defence. She has held a number of frontbench positions in the Seanad, including Foreign Affairs, Arts, Culture, Gaeltacht and the Islands, Justice, Law Reform and Defence and also served as Deputy Opposition Leader. She has served as a member of the Joint Oireachtas Committee on Marriage Breakdown, the Joint Oireachtas Committee on Women's Rights and the Select Committee on Judicial Separation, on which last she was Chairperson.
 
Taylor-Quinn was a member of Clare County Council from 1979 to 2009 when she decided to retire from politics. She is a former Mayor of the County Council (2008–09), and was the first Fine Gael Mayor in Clare. She was also the Fine Gael group leader on the County Council until 2009. She is married to George Quinn, and has two sons.

References

1951 births
Living people
Alumni of the University of Galway
Fine Gael TDs
Fine Gael senators
Irish schoolteachers
Local councillors in County Clare
Members of the 16th Seanad
Members of the 20th Seanad
Members of the 21st Seanad
20th-century women members of Seanad Éireann
21st-century women members of Seanad Éireann
Members of the 22nd Dáil
Members of the 24th Dáil
Members of the 25th Dáil
Members of the 26th Dáil
20th-century women Teachtaí Dála
Politicians from County Clare